Shawn Sheldon (born November 18, 1964) is an American wrestler. He competed in the men's Greco-Roman 52 kg at the 1988 Summer Olympics and the 1992 Summer Olympics. He won the silver medal in men's Greco-Roman 52 kg at the 1991 World Wrestling Championships.

He worked as a consultant at the United States Olympic Training Center from 2002 until 2004, when he took over the Community Olympic Development Program for Palm Beach County, Florida.

References

1964 births
Living people
American male sport wrestlers
Olympic wrestlers of the United States
Wrestlers at the 1988 Summer Olympics
Wrestlers at the 1992 Summer Olympics
Sportspeople from Norwich, Connecticut
Pan American Games medalists in wrestling
Pan American Games silver medalists for the United States
Pan American Games bronze medalists for the United States
Wrestlers at the 1987 Pan American Games
Wrestlers at the 1991 Pan American Games
Wrestlers at the 1995 Pan American Games
World Wrestling Championships medalists
Medalists at the 1991 Pan American Games
Medalists at the 1995 Pan American Games